Ronald L. Watts  (born 27 June 1934) is a retired lieutenant general in the United States Army. His assignments included Commanding General of 1st Infantry Division, 2nd Armored Division, VII Corps and Deputy Commanding General of First United States Army.

References

1934 births
Living people
United States Army generals
Recipients of the Legion of Merit